Integral field spectrographs (IFS) combine spectrographic and imaging capabilities in the optical or infrared wavelength domains (0.32 μm – 24 μm) to get from a single exposure spatially resolved spectra in a bi-dimensional region. Developed at first for the study of astronomical objects, this technique is now also used in many other fields, such bio-medical science and Earth remote sensing, usually under the name of snapshot hyperspectral imaging.

Rationale 

With the notable exception of individual stars, most astronomical objects are spatially resolved by large telescopes [Figure JWST moderately deep exposure]. For spectroscopic studies, the optimum would then be to get a spectrum for each spatial pixel (often call a spaxel in the IFS jargon) in the instrument field of view, getting full information on each target. This is loosely called a datacube from its two spatial and one spectral dimensions. 
Since both visible charge-coupled devices (CCD) and infrared detector arrays (aka Starring Arrays) used for astronomical instruments are bi-dimensional only, it is a non-trivial feat to develop spectrographic systems able to deliver 3D data cubes from the output of 2D detectors. Such instruments are usually christened 3D Spectrographs in the astronomical field and hyperspectral imagers  in the non-astronomical ones. 3D spectrographs (e.g. scanning Fabry-Perot, Fourier transform spectrometer) often use time as the third dimension, performing either spectral or spatial scanning to build their data cubes. Integral field spectrography (IFS) refers to the subset of 3D spectrographs that instead deliver a data cube from a single exposure.

One major advantage of the IFS approach for ground-based telescopic observations is that it automatically provides homogenous data sets despite the unavoidable variability of Earth’s atmospheric transmission, spectral emission and image blurring during exposures. This is not the case for scanned systems for which the data ‘cubes’ are built by a set of successive exposures. IFS, whether ground or space based, have also the huge advantage to detect much fainter objects in a given exposure than scanning systems, if at the cost of a much smaller sky field area.

After a slow start from the late 1980s on, Integral field spectroscopy has become a mainstream astrophysical tool in the optical to mid-infrared regions, addressing a whole gamut of astronomical sources, essentially any smallish individual object from solar system asteroids to vastly distant galaxies.

Methods 
Integral field spectrographs use so-called Integral Field Units (IFUs) to reformat the small square field of view into a more suitable shape, which is then spectrally dispersed by a grating spectrograph and recorded by a detector array. There are currently three different IFU flavors, using respectively a lenslet array, a fiber array or a mirror array.

Lenslet array  

An enlarged sky image feeds a mini-lens array, typically a few thousands identical lenses each ~ 1 mm diameter.  The lenslet array output is a regular grid of as many small telescope mirror images, which serves as the input for a multi-slit spectrograph that delivers the data cubes. This approach was advocated in the early 1980s, with the first lenslet-based optical TIGER IFS observations in 1987.

Pros are 100% on-sky spatial filling when using a square or hexagonal lenslet shape, high throughput, accurate photometry and an easy to build IFU. A significant con is the suboptimal use of precious detector pixels (~ 50% loss at least) in order to avoid contamination between adjacent spectra.

Instruments like SAURON on the William Herschel Telescope and the SPHERE IFS subsystem on the VLT use this technique.

Fiber array  

The sky image given by the telescope falls on a fiber-based image slicer. It is typically made of a few thousands fibers each ~ 0.1 mm diameter, with the square or circular input field reformatted into a narrow rectangular (long-slit like) output. The image slicer output is then coupled to a classical long-slit spectrograph that delivers the datacubes. A sky demonstrator successfully undertook the first ever IFS observation in 1980. It was followed by the full-fledged SILFID optical instrument some 5 years later. Coupling he circular fibers to a square or hexagonal lenslet array led to better light injection in the fiber and a nearly 100% filling factor of sky light.

Pros are 100% on-sky spatial filling, an efficient use of detector pixels and commercially available fiber-based image slicers. Cons are the sizable light loss in the fibers (~ 25%), their relatively poor photometric accuracy and their inability to work in a cryogenic environment. The latter limits wavelength coverage to < 1.6 μm.

This technique is used by instruments in many telescopes (such as INTEGRAL at the William Herschel Telescope), and particularly in currently ongoing large surveys of galaxies, such as CALIFA at the Calar Alto Observatory, SAMI at the Australian Astronomical Observatory, and MaNGA which is one of the surveys making up the next phase of the Sloan Digital Sky Survey.

Mirror array  
The sky image given by the telescope falls on a mirror-based slicer, typically made of ~30 rectangular mirrors, 0.1-0.2 mm wide, with the square input field reformatted into a narrow rectangular (long-slit like) output.  The slicer is then coupled to a classical long-slit spectrograph that delivers the data cubes. The first mirror-based slicer near infrared IFS 3D/SPIFFI got is first science result in 2003. The key mirror slicer system was quickly substantially improved under the Advanced Imaging Slicer code name.

Pros are high throughput, 100% on-sky spatial filling, optimal use of detector pixels and the capability to work at cryogenic temperatures. On the other hand, it is difficult and expensive to manufacture and to align, especially when working in the optical domain given the more stringent optical surfaces specifications.

Status 
IFS are currently deployed in one flavor or another on many large ground-based telescopes, in the visible or near infrared domains, and on some space telescopes as well, in particular on the JWST in the near and middle infrared domains. As the spatial resolution of telescopes in space (and also of ground-based telescopes through adaptive optics  based air turbulence corrections) has much improved in recent decades, the need for IFS facilities has become more and more pressing. Spectral resolution is usually a few thousands and wavelength coverage about one octave (i.e. a factor 2 in wavelength). Note that each IFS requires a finely tuned software package to transform the raw counts data in physical units (light intensity versus wavelength on precise sky locations)

Panoramic IFS 
With each spatial pixel dispersed on say 4096 spectral pixels on a state of the art 4096 x 4096 pixel detector, IFS fields of view are severely limited, ~10 arc second across when feed by an 8–10 m class telescope. That in turn mainly limits IFS-based astrophysical science to single small targets. A much larger field of view –1 arc minute across or a sky area 36 times larger- is needed to cover hundreds of highly distant galaxies, in a single, if very long (up to 100 hours), exposure. This in turn requires to develop IFS systems featuring at least ~ half a billion detector pixels.

The brute force approach would have been to build huge spectrographs feeding gigantic detector arrays. Instead, the two Panoramic IFS in operation by 2022, MUSE and VIRUS, are made of respectively 24 and 120 serial-produced optical IFS. This results in substantially smaller and cheaper instruments. The mirror slicer based MUSE instrument started operation at the ESO Very Large Telescope in 2014 and the fiber sliced based VIRUS on the Hobby-Eberly Telescope in 2021.

Multi-Object IFS 
It is conceptually straightforward to combine the capabilities of Integral Field Spectroscopy and Multi-Object Spectroscopy in a single instrument. This is done by deploying a number of small IFUs in a large sky patrol field, possibly a degree or more across. In that way, quite detailed information on e.g. a number of selected galaxies can be obtained in one go. There is of course a tradeoff between the spatial coverage on each target and the total number accessible of targets. FLAMES, the first instrument featuring this capability, had first light in this mode at the ESO Very Large Telescope  in 2002. A number of such facilities are now in operation in the Visible and the Near Infrared.

Even larger latitude in the choice of coverage of the patrol field has been proposed under the name of Diverse Field Spectroscopy (DFS) which would allow the observer to select arbitrary combinations of sky regions to maximize observing efficiency and scientific return. This requires technological developments, in particular versatile robotic target pickups and photonic switchyards.

Three-dimensional detectors 
Other techniques can achieve the same ends at different wavelengths. In particular, at radio wavelengths, simultaneous spectral information is obtained with heterodyne receivers, featuring large frequency coverage and huge spectral resolution.

In the X-Ray domain, owing to the high energy of individual photons, aptly called 3D photon counting detectors not only measure on the fly the 2D position of incoming photons but also their energy, hence their wavelength. Note nevertheless that spectral information is very coarse, with spectral resolutions ~10 only. One example is the ACIS Advanced CCD Imaging Spectrometer on NASA’s Chandra X-ray Observatory.  

In the Visible-Near Infrared, this approach is a lot harder with the much less energetic photons. Nevertheless small format superconducting detectors, with limited spectral resolution ~ 30 and cooled below 0.1 K, have been developed and successfully used, e.g. the 32x32 pixels ARCONS Camera at the Hale 200” Telescope. In contrast, ‘classical’ IFS usually feature spectral resolutions of a few thousands.

References

External links
 Optical 3D spectroscopy for Astronomy by Roland Bacon and Guy Monnet, 
 The Integral Field Spectroscopy wiki
 Integral field spectroscopy — A brief introduction by Jeremy Allington-Smith of the Durham Astronomical Instrumentation Group

Astronomical instruments
Telescopes
Spectrographs